Pristimantis anotis is a species of frog in the family Strabomantidae.
It is endemic to Venezuela.
Its natural habitats are tropical moist montane forests and rivers.

References

anotis
Endemic fauna of Venezuela
Amphibians of Venezuela
Amphibians described in 1955
Taxa named by Edmund Murton Walker
Taxonomy articles created by Polbot